Andy Murray was the competition's defending champion, but he didn't participate.

Rafael Nadal won the title beating Milos Raonic in the final.

Seeds

Draw

Draw

Play-offs

 Feliciano López replaces injured Jo-Wilfried Tsonga at Mubadala World Tennis Championship

References

World Tennis Championship
2016 in Emirati tennis